Baffle Ball is a pinball machine created in November 19, 1931 by David Gottlieb, founder of the Gottlieb amusement company.

Gameplay
For one US cent players get ten balls. These balls are fired up onto the playfield and fall into pockets and holes. Some ball targets are worth more than others, and players try to fire the ball at just the right speed. Unlike later pinball machines, Baffle Ball does not have flippers. The best target is the Baffle Ball, a tiny hole at the top which doubles all points. The game uses no electricity, and all scoring has to be done by hand.

Description
While bagatelle-derived "marble games" have long existed previously, Baffle Ball was the first commercially successful game of its type, being affordable enough for store and tavern owners to quickly recoup the machine's cost. Over 50,000 machines were made, jump-starting the arcade pinball field; it spawned a home version in 1932 called Baffle Ball Senior.

Baffle Ball was responsible for the launch of the company Gottlieb that went on to make pinball machines such as Ace High and Black Hole.  The game sat on top of bar counters and the bartender might award prizes for high scores. It is very popular with and sought after by collectors.

Digital version
The table was virtually recreated in pinball simulation video game, Microsoft Pinball Arcade, although adjustments were made to the game rules. Instead of the normal silver balls, colored balls, that matches the color of the target, are played. Extra points are awarded if the player lands the ball in the target that exactly matches the color of the ball.

See also
Play-Boy - the follow up game

References

External links
 

1931 pinball machines
Gottlieb pinball machines